The Colonial Order of the Star of Italy was founded as a colonial order of chivalry on 18 June 1914 by Italian King Victor Emmanuel III, to reward soldiers deployed to the colony of Libya.  The order had fallen into abeyance by 1943, when Allied forces conquered the colonies of Italian North Africa.

The various degrees of the order, with limits to their number, were as follows:

See also
List of Italian orders of knighthood
Order of the Roman Eagle

References

1914 establishments in Italy
Star of Italy, Colonial Order of the
Star of Italy, Colonial Order of the
Awards disestablished in 1943
Star of Italy, Colonial Order of the
Italian Libya
Military awards and decorations of Italy